Boguszów-Gorce  is a town in Wałbrzych County, Lower Silesian Voivodeship, in south-western Poland. It was established in 1973 from the merger of four separate towns: the city of Boguszów, the city of Gorce, the village of Kuźnice Świdnickie and the village of Stary Lesieniec.

It lies on the border between the Wałbrzych Mountains (Gór Wałbrzyskich) and The Stone Mountains (Gór Kamiennych) in The Central Stronket Sudetes (Sudety Środkowe). As of June 2021, it has a population of 15,085.

Twin towns – sister cities

Boguszów-Gorce is twinned with:
 Smiřice, Czech Republic

References

Cities and towns in Lower Silesian Voivodeship
Wałbrzych County
Cities in Silesia